HMS Bullfinch was a three-funnel, 30-knot destroyer ordered by the Royal Navy under the 1896–1897 Naval Estimates. She was the third ship to carry this name since it was introduced in 1857 for a 4-gun wooden-screw gunboat.

Construction
Bullfinch was laid down on 17 September 1896, at the Earle's Shipbuilding and Engineering Company Limited shipyard at Hull, Yorkshire, and launched on 10 February 1898.  During her trials while steaming at  she suffered a major accident in which the connecting rod to the high-pressure cylinder broke and released steam into the forward engine room. Eight individuals were killed and six were injured. The broken connecting rod punctured the hull, and Lieutenant F.G. Dineley (in command during trials) ordered the use of collision mats to stem the intake of water and she was able to make port. The destroyer was completed and accepted by the Royal Navy in June 1901.

Service history

Early service
After commissioning Bullfinch was assigned to the Channel Fleet. Commander Brian Barttelot was appointed in command on 24 February 1902, and she was assigned to the Portsmouth instructional flotilla. In May 1902 she towed her sister ship  to Queenstown, after the latter had struck a rock off Kildorney.

She spent her operational career mainly in Home Waters operating with the Channel Fleet as part of the Devonport Flotilla.

On 30 August 1912 the Admiralty directed all destroyer classes were to be designated by alpha characters starting with the letter 'A'. After 30 September 1913, she was known as a C-class destroyer and had the letter 'C' painted on the hull below the bridge area and on either the fore or aft funnel.

World War I
In September 1914 the 7th Flotilla was redeployed to the Humber River. She remained in this deployment until the cessation of hostilities. Her employment within the Humber Patrol included anti-submarine and counter-mining patrols. On 15 August 1914, she was involved in a collision in British waters, with the loss of four stokers.

In 1919 Bullfinch was paid off and laid-up in reserve awaiting disposal. She was sold on 10 June 1919 to Young of Sunderland for breaking.

Pennant numbers

References
NOTE:  All tabular data under General Characteristics only from the listed Jane's Fighting Ships volume unless otherwise specified

Bibliography
 
 
 
 
 
 
 
 

 

Ships built on the Humber
1898 ships
C-class destroyers (1913)
World War I destroyers of the United Kingdom